James and the Giant Peach is a 1996 musical fantasy film directed by Henry Selick, based on the 1961 novel of the same name by Roald Dahl. It was produced by Tim Burton and Denise Di Novi, and starred Paul Terry as James. The film is a combination of live action and stop-motion animation. Co-stars Joanna Lumley and Miriam Margolyes played James's aunts in the live-action segments, and Simon Callow, Richard Dreyfuss, Susan Sarandon, Jane Leeves, David Thewlis, and Margolyes voiced his insect friends in the animation sequences.

Released on April 12, 1996, in the United States, the film received generally positive reviews from critics, who praised its story and visual aspects.

Plot

In summer 1948, James Henry Trotter is a young orphan living with his sadistic and domineering aunts Spiker and Sponge after his parents were eaten by a ghost rhinoceros on his birthday. One day, after rescuing a spider from his hysterical aunts, James obtains magical "crocodile tongues" from a mysterious old man, which grows a colossal peach on nearby old peach tree that Spiker and Sponge exploit as a tourist attraction. At night, James eats through the peach to find a pit with several human-sized anthropomorphic invertebrates: Mr. Grasshopper, Mr. Centipede, Ms. Spider (who was actually the spider he saved from Spiker and Sponge), Mr. Earthworm, Mrs. Ladybug, and Mrs. Glowworm. As they hear Spiker and Sponge searching for James, Centipede cuts the stem connecting the peach to the tree and the peach rolls away to the Atlantic Ocean.

The invertebrates drive on the peach to New York City, as James has dreamed of visiting the Empire State Building like his parents wanted to. Obstacles include a giant mechanical shark and undead skeletal pirates in the icy waters of the Arctic. When the group arrive, they are suddenly attacked by the tempestuous form of the rhinoceros that killed James' parents. James, though frightened, gets his friends to safety and confronts the rhino before it strikes the peach with lightning. James and the peach fall to the city below, landing on top of the Empire State Building. After he is rescued by firefighters, Spiker and Sponge arrive and attempt to claim James and the peach. James tells the crowd of his fantastical adventure and exposes his aunts' mistreatment. Enraged at James' betrayal, Spiker and Sponge attempt to hack James with stolen fire axes, but are stopped by the insects and arrested by the police.

James introduces his friends to the New Yorkers and allows the children to eat up the peach. The peach pit is made into a cottage in Central Park, where James lives happily with the bugs, who form his new family and also find success and fame in the city. Mr. Centipede runs for New York mayor and is now James’ father, Miss Spider opens a club and is now his mother, Mr. Earthworm becomes a mascot for a skin-care company and is now either James' uncle or cousin, Mrs. Ladybug becomes an obstetrician and is James' aunt, Mr. Grasshopper becomes a concert violinist and is now James' grandfather, and Mrs. Glowworm becomes the light in the torch of the Statue of Liberty and is now his grandmother. James celebrates his ninth birthday with his new family and friends.

A post-credits scene shows a kid playing an arcade game called Spike the Aunts, which involves the rhinoceros hitting the aunts in the buttocks.

Cast
 Paul Terry as James Henry Trotter
 Miriam Margolyes as Aunt Sponge
 Joanna Lumley as Aunt Spiker
 Pete Postlethwaite as Narrator/the Magic Man
 Steven Culp as James' Father
 Susan Turner-Cray as James' Mother
 Mike Starr as Beat Cop

Voices
 Simon Callow as Mr. Grasshopper
 Richard Dreyfuss as Mr. Centipede
 Jeff Bennett as Mr. Centipede (singing voice)
 Jane Leeves as Mrs. Ladybug
 Susan Sarandon as Miss Spider
 David Thewlis as Mr. Earthworm
 Miriam Margolyes as Mrs. Glowworm

Production 
At Walt Disney Animation Studios in the early 1980s, Joe Ranft tried to convince the staff to produce a film based on Roald Dahl's James and the Giant Peach (1961), a book that enamored him with its "liberating" material ever since he first read it in third grade. However, Disney refused for reasons of a potentially expensive and difficult animation process and the source material's weird subject matter. Among the animators exposed to the book by Ranft was Henry Selick; while he enjoyed the book and thought about adapting it to screen for several years, he understood the obstacles doing so, such as the source material's dreamy nature, episodic structure, and the reputation of other Dahl books being so agitational some parts of the world banned them.

Felicity Dahl, Roald's widow and executor of his estate, began offering film rights to the book in the summer in 1992; among those interested included Steven Spielberg and Danny DeVito.

Walt Disney Pictures acquired the film rights to the book from the Dahl estate in 1992. Brian Rosen was hired as producer by Disney for his experience in animated projects like FernGully: The Last Rainforest (1992) and live-action films such as Mushrooms (1995).

Dennis Potter was hired to write a draft. Rosen descripted it as "slightly black and bizarre", a tone Disney did not approve of, particularly with the sharks being Nazis. Once Potter died, Karey Kirkpatrick and Bruce Joel Rubin came in to write separate drafts, of which Kirkpatrick's was chosen. Unlike the novel, James's aunts are not killed by the rolling peach (though his parents' deaths occur as in the novel) but follow him to New York. The character Silkworm was removed to not overload on the amount of characters to animate; in the book, her purpose was limited to what Miss Spider did in the film, which was to attach the peach to several seagulls during the shark chase.

Before the start of production, Disney and Selick debated on whether the film should be live-action or stop-motion-animated, the company skeptical of the stop-motion solution. Selick had originally planned James to be a live actor through the entire film, then later considered doing the whole film in stop-motion; but ultimately settled on entirely live-action and entirely stop-motion sequences, to keep lower costs. The film begins with 20 minutes of live-action, but becomes stop-motion animation after James enters the peach, and then live-action again when James arrives in New York City (although the arthropod characters remained in stop-motion). Like The Wizard of Oz (1939), the color palette changes when James enters the Peach to indicate he has entered a magical setting, from greys and greens to vibrant colors.

Songs

Release
The film was theatrically released on April 12, 1996.

Disney released the film worldwide except for a few countries in Europe including the United Kingdom, where Pathé (the owner of co-producer Allied Filmmakers) handled distribution and sold the rights to independent companies. The only countries where Disney does not have control over the movie are the United Kingdom and Germany, where the film was released by Guild Film Distribution and Tobis Film respectively.

Box office
The film opened at the number 2 spot at the box office, missing out on the top spot to Primal Fear.  The film took in $7,539,098 that weekend, and stayed in the top 10 for the next 5 weeks before dropping to 11th place. The film went on to gross over $28,946,127 domestically bringing its worldwide total to $28,946,127, which against a budget of $38 million, made the film commercially a box office bomb.

Home media
The film was released on VHS on October 15, 1996. A digitally restored Blu-ray/DVD combo pack was released by Walt Disney Studios Home Entertainment on August 3, 2010 in the United States.

Reception
Though Roald Dahl refused numerous offers to have a film version of James and the Giant Peach produced during his lifetime, his widow, Liccy, approved an offer to have a live-action version produced. She thinks Roald "would have been delighted with what they did with James. It is a wonderful film."

The website's critical consensus states: "The arresting and dynamic visuals, offbeat details and light-as-air storytelling make James and the Giant Peach solid family entertainment." Metacritic, which uses a weighted average, lists the film with a weighted average score of 78 out of 100 based on 36 critics, indicating "generally favorable reviews." Audiences polled by CinemaScore gave the film an average grade of "A-" on an A+ to F scale.

Owen Gleiberman of Entertainment Weekly gave the film a positive review, praising the animated part, but calling the live-action segments "crude." Writing in The New York Times, Janet Maslin called the film "a technological marvel, arch and innovative with a daringly offbeat visual conception" and "a strenuously artful film with a macabre edge."

The film grossed $28.9 million in the United States and Canada and $8.8 million in the rest of the world for a worldwide total of $37.7 million.

Awards and nominations
The film was nominated for an Academy Award for Best Music, Original Musical or Comedy Score, by Randy Newman. It won Best Animated Feature Film at the Annecy International Animated Film Festival.

Potential remake 
In August 2016, Sam Mendes was revealed to be in negotiations with Disney to direct another live action adaptation of the novel, with Nick Hornby in talks for the script. In May 2017, however, Mendes was no longer attached to the project due to his entering talks with Disney about directing a live-action film adaptation of Pinocchio.

References

Citations

Bibliography

External links

 
 
 
 

1996 films
Annecy Cristal for a Feature Film winners
1996 animated films
1990s American animated films
1990s fantasy adventure films
1990s musical comedy films
American children's animated adventure films
American children's animated fantasy films
American children's animated musical films
American fantasy adventure films
American fantasy comedy films
American musical comedy films
Animated films about orphans
British animated fantasy films
British children's animated films
British children's fantasy films
British fantasy adventure films
British musical comedy films
1990s English-language films
Animated films about children
Films scored by Randy Newman
Films based on works by Roald Dahl
Films directed by Henry Selick
Films produced by Denise Di Novi
Films using stop-motion animation
Films with live action and animation
1990s stop-motion animated films
Walt Disney Pictures animated films
Films shot in London
Films set in England
Films set in New York City
Films set in 1958
1996 comedy films
Films with screenplays by Jonathan Roberts (writer)
1990s British films